Vestavind (The West Wind) is a local Norwegian newspaper published in Sveio in Hordaland county. 

The newspaper appears once a week and covers events in the municipality of Sveio. It is published in Nynorsk and is edited by Irene Flatnes Haldin. Gunn Bjørgen is in charge of accounting, finances, and subscriptions. Bernhard Hegglund is the chairman of the company Vestavind AS. Prominent journalists that have worked for Vestavind include Irene Jacobsen, Mona Terjesen, Sigurd Olav Larsen, and Ellen Tveit.

History
Vestavind was launched in 1986 as a simple A3 sheet and distributed for free, sponsored by advertisements. Later the number of pages grew, and now the paper usually has 20 to 24 pages. In October 2010, Mona Terjesen agreed to a temporary position as editor of the paper. In January 2012 she was succeeded by Irene Flatnes Haldin.

Editors 
 Eva Sternhoff Austvik, 1986–1989
 Per A. Enge
 Ingeborg Marie Jensen
 Margrethe Hegland (Langebo)
 Sigurd Olav Larsen
 Sveio Olav Hansen
 Ellen Tveit
 Irene Jacobsen
 Mona Terjesen, 2010–2011
 Irene Flatnes Haldin, 2012–

Circulation
According to the Norwegian Audit Bureau of Circulations and National Association of Local Newspapers, Vestavind has had the following annual circulation:
2004: 1,229
2005: 1,426
2006: 1,540
2007: 1,481
2008: 1,599
2009: 1,572
2010: 1,664
2011: 1,621
2012: 1,615
2013: 1,647
2014: 1,662
2015: 1,587
2016: 1,603

References

External links
Vestavind homepage

Newspapers published in Norway
Norwegian-language newspapers
Sveio
Mass media in Hordaland
Newspapers established in 1986
1986 establishments in Norway
Nynorsk